Mohammad Rabiei (Persian: محمد ربیعی) is an Iranian football manager who is currently head coach of Mes Rafsanjan.

Honours
Albadr
League 2: 2012–13

Shahrdari Ardabil
League 2: 2013–14

Mes Rafsanjan
Azadegan League: 2019–20

References

1981 births
Living people
Iranian football managers
Mes Rafsanjan F.C. managers
Persian Gulf Pro League managers